Kalateh Menar (also Romanized as Kalāteh Menār and Kalāteh-ye Manār; also known as Kalāt-i-Mīnār) is a village in Pain Velayat Rural District, Razaviyeh District, Mashhad County, Razavi Khorasan Province, Iran. At the 2006 census, its population was 719, in 164 families.

References 

Populated places in Mashhad County